The End is Near is the fifth studio album by the American band Five Iron Frenzy, self-released on June 18, 2003. The album was later widely re-released as a part of double album titled The End is Here (stylized as The End is Near Here) by Five Minute Walk Records on April 20, 2004. The double album includes both the studio album and a live recording of the band's final concert performance. The album was intended as the band's last as was the tour used to promote it, until the band announced a reunion in 2011 and new album, Engine of a Million Plots released in 2013.

Packaging and release

The End is Near was recorded in early 2003 and sold directly by the band during their farewell tour and through their official website. The cover and packaging artwork was done by Doug TenNapel, the visual artist who had previously worked on three other Five Iron Frenzy covers. The packaging for The End is Near features a red motif for the cover and artwork while the re-release, The End is Here, includes a green layout. Otherwise, both versions contain the same artwork by TenNapel. The earlier self-released version is missing a barcode and instead included a blank space reading "I LAST SAW FIVE IRON FRENZY ON" which the band themselves stamped with that day's date when sold from their merchandise tables on their farewell tour.

On November 22, 2003 at the Fillmore Auditorium in Denver, Colorado, the band played their final show and recorded it. On April 20, 2004, the double-disc set The End is Here (stylized as The End is Near Here) was released for widely distributed retail. This set includes the studio album and the final performance on two separate discs. An exclusive inclusion on the double-disc set was one extra studio track "The Cross of Saint Andrew" which was not included on the earlier self-released version of the studio album.

Both versions of the CD were packaged with a cardboard slipcover over the standard CD jewel case, which was bundled with a high-quality 15-page booklet containing band photographs, artwork by TenNapel, lyrics and words of farewell to the fans. Inside the front lid of the jewel case of the earlier self-released version was a simple one-sheet reproduction of the cover, while inside the front lid of the double-disc set was a fold-out poster featuring a collage of photographs from the band's farewell performance.

Music 
The song "Wizard Needs Food, Badly" is a reference to the 1985 arcade game Gauntlet, and the song features a sample of the line spoken in the video game. "That's How the Story Ends" is a song stylized along the lines of "The Raven," a poem by Edgar Allan Poe. Backmasking dialog at the beginning of the song is lead singer Reese Roper saying "Sandwiches, they make the best friends." Lyrically the song makes reference to past Five Iron Frenzy songs and gives epilogues to the narrative of those songs. The songs referenced are "Where Is Micah?", "Blue Comb '78", "Shut Up", "The Untimely Death of Brad", "These Are Not My Pants (The Rock Opera)", "Combat Chuck", "Kitty Doggy" and "Kingdom of the Dinosaurs". The coda of the song "On Distant Shores" is borrowed from Five Iron Frenzy's "Every New Day," a song that closed all their live performances.

Both versions of the studio album feature a hidden track of Five Iron Frenzy talking in the recording studio. Additionally, the studio album on the double-disc set features a second hidden track composed of outtakes from the final performance which includes mostly stage banter that was cut from the second disc for pacing purposes.

Included in the live performance of their final show is a medley of Five Iron Frenzy performing selections from popular songs they were unable to perform in their entirety during the show. This track is inexplicably absent from recent digital versions of the album like those on Spotify and iTunes. No exact reasons for this exclusion has been stated by the band. It can also be noted that no permission is listed in the album's copyright notes for the inclusion of the Dan Hill song "Sometimes When We Touch." The medley is broken down as follows:

[0:00 - 2:20] - "A Flowery Song" (Upbeats and Beatdowns)
[2:20 - 2:52] - "Suckerpunch" (Our Newest Album Ever!)
[2:52 - 4:00] - "One Girl Army" (Quantity Is Job 1)
[4:00 - 4:36] - "My Evil Plan To Save The World" (Quantity Is Job 1)
[4:36 - 5:20] - "Sometimes When We Touch" (Dan Hill's Longer Fuse)
[5:20 - 5:56] - "Pre-Ex Girlfriend" (Electric Boogaloo)
[5:56 - 6:31] - "Combat Chuck" (Upbeats and Beatdowns)
[6:31 - 7:08] - "Dandelions" (Quantity Is Job 1)
[7:08 - 7:31] - "Superpowers" (Our Newest Album Ever!)
[7:31 - 8:05] - "Cool Enough For You" (Upbeats and Beatdowns)

Reception 
Both the original version of the studio album and the double-disc studio and live set received positive reviews.

Jesus Freak Hideout reviewed the album of its original self-released form and gave the album a 4.5 out of 5 rating. Cross Rhythms also reviewing the first version of the studio album gave it a 10 out of 10.

Reviewing the double disc set The Phantom Tollbooth gave it a five out of five. Likewise, HM Magazine music critic Doug Van Pelt stated that the live material captured the raw energy and spiritual fervor that the band was known for.

Track listing

Self-Released "Red" version 
All lyrics written by Reese Roper, unless specified otherwise.

Retail released "Green" version

Charts 
Album - Billboard (North America)

Personnel
 Reese Roper - lead vocals
 Dennis Culp - trombone, background vocals, lead vocals on "So Far, So Bad"
 Keith Hoerig - bass
 Nathanael "Brad" Dunham - trumpet
 Micah Ortega - guitars, background vocals
 Leanor "Jeff the Girl" Ortega - saxophones
 Andy Verdecchio - drums
 Sonnie Johnston - guitars

References

Five Iron Frenzy albums
2003 albums
Albums with cover art by Doug TenNapel
Self-released albums